This is a list of episodes of the South Korean variety-music show King of Mask Singer in 2020. The show airs on MBC as part of their Sunday Night lineup. The names listed below are in performance order.

 – Contestant is instantly eliminated by the live audience and judging panel
 – After being eliminated, contestant performs a prepared song for the next round and takes off their mask during the instrumental break
 – After being eliminated and revealing their identity, contestant has another special performance.
 – Contestant advances to the next round.
 – Contestant becomes the challenger.
 – Mask King.

Episodes

118th Generation Mask King (cont.)

Episode 236 was broadcast on January 5, 2020.

119th Generation Mask King

Contestants: Chanmi (AOA), Kim Young-min, Jihoo (IZ), Kang Hyung-ho (Forestella), Jung Yi-han, 

Episode 237

Episode 237 was broadcast on January 12, 2020. This marks the beginning of the Hundred-nineteenth Generation.

Episode 238

Episode 238 was broadcast on January 19, 2020.

120th Generation Mask King

Contestants: Son Ho-young (g.o.d), Euijin (Sonamoo), Jang Gwang, Kim Young-chul, Jaeyoon (SF9), Punchnello, Jung Mi-ae, Kang Hyun-jeong

Episode 239

Episode 239 was broadcast on January 26, 2020. This marks the beginning of the Hundred-twentieth Generation.

Episode 240

Episode 240 was broadcast on February 2, 2020.

121st Generation Mask King

Episode 241

Episode 241 was broadcast on February 9, 2020. This marks the beginning of the Hundred-twenty-first Generation.

Episode 242

Episode 242 was broadcast on February 16, 2020.

122nd Generation Mask King

Contestants: , Miyeon ((G)I-dle), Im Kang-sung, Seung-gook Lee, Kim Jung-mo, Boi B (Rhythm Power), Seungyoon (Winner)

Episode 243

Episode 243 was broadcast on February 23, 2020. This marks the beginning of the Hundred-twenty-second Generation.

Episode 244

Episode 244 was broadcast on March 1, 2020.

123rd Generation Mask King

Contestants: Jane (Momoland), YOYOMI, Son Ji-hyun, I'll (Hoppipolla (band)), Yoon Jung-soo, 

Episode 245

Episode 245 was broadcast on March 8, 2020. This marks the beginning of the Hundred-twenty-third Generation.

Episode 246

Episode 246 was broadcast on March 15, 2020.

124th Generation Mask King

Contestants: Shin Yi, Wax, Ha Hyun-gon (Click-B), No Min-hyuk (Click-B), Byung-hyun Kim, Chuu (Loona), Michael K. Lee, Jibeom (Golden Child)

Episode 247

Episode 247 was broadcast on March 22, 2020. This marks the beginning of the Hundred-twenty-fourth Generation.

Episode 248

Episode 248 was broadcast on March 29, 2020.

125th Generation Mask King

Contestants: Kim Hye-ri, Kim Woo-seok (UP10TION), Baek Chan (8Eight), Rangshow, Hyerim (Wonder Girls)

Episode 249

Episode 249 was broadcast on April 5, 2020. This marks the beginning of the Hundred-twenty-fifth Generation.

Episode 250

Episode 250 was broadcast on April 12, 2020.

126th Generation Mask King

Contestants: Ha Do-kwon, Ko Woo-rim (Forestella), Hyun Jung-hwa, Choi Yoo-jung (Weki Meki), Hwang In-sun, Lee Han-wi

Episode 251

Episode 251 was broadcast on April 19, 2020. This marks the beginning of the Hundred-twenty-sixth Generation.

Episode 252

Episode 252 was broadcast on April 26, 2020.

127th Generation Mask King

Contestants: Code Kunst, Na Tae-joo, Cha Cheong-hwa, Kim Kang-hoon, Kim Ho-joong, Abhishek Gupta (Lucky), Lee Min (As One)

Episode 253

Episode 253 was broadcast on May 3, 2020. This marks the beginning of the Hundred-twenty-seventh Generation.

Episode 254

Episode 254 was broadcast on May 10, 2020.

128th Generation Mask King

Contestants: Munik (Dongkiz), Yang Kyung-won, Shim Ji-ho, Jo Yu-ri (Iz*One), Shim Eun-woo, Kim Jung-nam (Turbo)

Episode 255

Episode 255 was broadcast on May 17, 2020. This marks the beginning of the Hundred-twenty-eighth Generation.

Episode 256

Episode 256 was broadcast on May 24, 2020.

129th Generation Mask King

Episode 257

Episode 257 was broadcast on May 31, 2020. This marks the beginning of the Hundred-twenty-ninth Generation.

Episode 258

Episode 258 was broadcast on June 7, 2020.

130th Generation Mask King

Contestants: Lena (GWSN), Swings, Park Chan-sook

Episode 259

Episode 259 was broadcast on June 14, 2020. This marks the beginning of the Hundred-thirtieth Generation.

Episode 260

Episode 260 was broadcast on June 21, 2020.

131st Generation Mask King

Contestants: Seungah (Rainbow), Chaewon (April), Changbin (Stray Kids), Yang Dong-geun, Jangjun (Golden Child), Cha Jun-hwan, Kim Jung-min, 

Episode 261

Episode 261 was broadcast on June 28, 2020. This marks the beginning of the Hundred-thirty-first Generation.

Episode 262

Episode 262 was broadcast on July 5, 2020.

132nd Generation Mask King

Contestants: Shin A-lam, KittiB, Exy (Cosmic Girls), J-Black, Ha.E.D, Ahn Soo-ji, 

Episode 263

Episode 263 was broadcast on July 12, 2020. This marks the beginning of the Hundred-thirty-second Generation.

Episode 264

Episode 264 was broadcast on July 19, 2020.

133rd Generation Mask King

Contestants: Yeonho (Verivery), Bizzy, KCM, Kim Hyun-soo (Forte di Quattro), Yang Jung-a

Episode 265

Episode 265 was broadcast on July 26, 2020. This marks the beginning of the Hundred-thirty-third Generation.

Episode 266

Episode 266 was broadcast on August 2, 2020.

134th Generation Mask King

Contestants: Soyeon, Park Eun-ji, Shin Cheol, Cheetah, Jung Kyung-cheon, Min Woo-hyuk,  (Indigo), 

Episode 267

Episode 267 was broadcast on August 9, 2020. This marks the beginning of the Hundred-thirty-fourth Generation.

Episode 268

Episode 268 was broadcast on August 16, 2020.

135th Generation Mask King

Episode 269

Episode 269 was broadcast on August 23, 2020. This marks the beginning of the Hundred-thirty-fifth Generation.

Episode 270

Episode 270 was broadcast on August 30, 2020.

136th Generation Mask King

Contestants: Han Seung-woo (Victon), Kim San-ho, Park Bo-ram,  (Cleo), Poppin' Hyun Joon

Episode 271

Episode 271 was broadcast on September 6, 2020. This marks the beginning of the Hundred-thirty-sixth Generation.

Episode 272

Episode 272 was broadcast on September 13, 2020.

137th Generation Mask King

Contestants: Joomin, Ricky (Teen Top), HyunJin (Loona), Lee Hyung-taik, Shim Hyung-rae, Choi Ran, Yang Yo-seob (Highlight), Lee Hye-sung

Episode 273

Episode 273 was broadcast on September 20, 2020. This marks the beginning of the Hundred-thirty-seventh Generation.

Episode 274

Episode 274 was broadcast on September 27, 2020.

138th Generation Mask King

Contestants: , Sleepy, Kwak Min-jeong, Kei (Lovelyz), Hyun Young, 

Episode 275

Episode 275 was broadcast on October 4, 2020. This marks the beginning of the Hundred-thirty-eighth Generation.

Episode 276

Episode 276 was broadcast on October 11, 2020.

139th Generation Mask King

Contestants: , Shin Seung-hwan, Hwang Chan-seop, Yezi, Soohyun (U-KISS), Ahn Ye-eun, Mino

Episode 277

Episode 277 was broadcast on October 18, 2020. This marks the beginning of the Hundred-thirty-ninth Generation.

Episode 278

Episode 278 was broadcast on October 25, 2020.

140th Generation Mask King

Contestants: Yuqi ((G)I-dle), HaEun, Epaksa, Minhyuk (Monsta X), Ryu Hwa-young, 

Episode 279

Episode 279 was broadcast on November 1, 2020. This marks the beginning of the Hundred-fortieth Generation.

Episode 280

Episode 280 was broadcast on November 8, 2020.

141st Generation Mask King

Contestants: Kal So-won, Jaechan (Dongkiz), Joo Da-in, Kim Lip (Loona), Penomeco

Episode 281

Episode 281 was broadcast on November 15, 2020. This marks the beginning of the Hundred-forty-first Generation.

Episode 282

Episode 282 was broadcast on November 22, 2020.

142nd Generation Mask King

Contestants: Denise (Secret Number), Ryang Ha, Yedam (Treasure), Yoo So-young, Wang Seok-hyeon, Muwoong (Baechigi), Louie (Geeks)

Episode 283

Episode 283 was broadcast on November 29, 2020. This marks the beginning of the Hundred-forty-second Generation.

Episode 284

Episode 284 was broadcast on December 6, 2020.

143rd Generation Mask King

Contestants: Nancy (Momoland), Mihal Ashminov, Samuel Seo, Shin Jin-sik, 

Episode 285

Episode 285 was broadcast on December 13, 2020. This marks the beginning of the Hundred-forty-third Generation.

Episode 286

Episode 286 was broadcast on December 20, 2020.

144th Generation Mask King

Contestants: Elly (Weki Meki), Jeong Minseong (La Poem), Chan (Victon), Outsider, Nam Hyun-hee, Shin Hyun-woo, 

Episode 287 was broadcast on December 27, 2020. This marks the beginning of the Hundred-forty-fourth Generation.

Notes

References 

Lists of King of Mask Singer episodes
Lists of variety television series episodes
Lists of South Korean television series episodes
2020 in South Korean television